Walter Riddell may refer to:
 Walter Alexander Riddell, Canadian civil servant, diplomat, and academic
 Sir Walter Riddell, 12th Baronet, British academic